Pero behrensaria, or Behr's pero, is a species of geometrid moth in the family Geometridae. It is found in North America.

The MONA or Hodges number for Pero behrensaria is 6760.

Subspecies
These three subspecies belong to the species Pero behrensaria:
 Pero behrensaria behrensaria
 Pero behrensaria daulus Rindge, 1955
 Pero behrensaria sperryi Rindge, 1955

References

Further reading

External links

 

Azelinini
Articles created by Qbugbot
Moths described in 1871